"How U Get a Record Deal?" is the lead single released from Big Daddy Kane's fifth studio album, Looks Like a Job For.... The song is notable for being one of the first singles to be produced by the popular production duo, the Trackmasters.

Though the song did not reach the crossover success that its follow-up, "Very Special", achieved, it became his sixth top ten hit on the Billboard Hot Rap Singles chart, peaking at number seven.

Single track listing

A-Side
"How U Get a Record Deal?" (Album Version) – 3:56
"How U Get a Record Deal?" (Clean Radio Edit) – 3:56
"How U Get a Record Deal?" (A cappella) – 3:19

B-Side
"Here Comes Kane, Scoob and Scrap" (Album Version) – 4:24
"Here Comes Kane, Scoob and Scrap" (Instrumental) – 4:23
"How U Get a Record Deal?" (Instrumental) – 3:56

Chart history

1993 songs
1993 singles
Big Daddy Kane songs
Song recordings produced by Trackmasters
Warner Records singles
Songs written by Big Daddy Kane
Cold Chillin' Records singles